The Caspian trout (Salmo caspius) is a disputed species of fish in the family Salmonidae. It is native to Eurasia, where it occurs only in the southern Caspian Sea basin. It reaches 25 cm (9.8 inches) in standard length. While historically considered a distinct species, recent evidence suggests that the Caspian trout, as well as the Black Sea salmon (Salmo labrax) and the Abant trout (Salmo abanticus) are not distinct species but are instead morphs of the brown trout (Salmo trutta).

References 

Fish described in 1877
Salmo